Shenorock is a hamlet and census-designated place (CDP) located in the town of Somers in Westchester County, New York, United States. The population was 1,898 at the 2010 census.

The community is named after Shawanórõckquot, a Wiechquaeskeck sachem.

Geography
Shenorock is located at  (41.331850, -73.739323).

The community is bounded by U.S. Route 202 to the south and New York State Route 118 to the west. Shenorock is north of the Amawalk Reservoir.

Demographics

At the 2000 census there were 1,887 people, 650 households, and 505 families residing in the hamlet. The population density was 2,753.5 per square mile (1,055.9/km). There were 676 housing units at an average density of 986.4/sq mi (378.3/km).  The racial makeup of the hamlet was 95.97% White, 1.22% African American, 0.05% Native American, 0.95% Asian, 0.90% from other races, and 0.90% from two or more races. Hispanic or Latino of any race were 4.66%.

Of the 650 households, 42.5% had children under the age of 18 living with them, 66.9% were married couples living together, 8.5% had a female householder with no husband present, and 22.2% were non-families. 18.2% of households were one person, and 7.2% were one person aged 65 or older. The average household size was 2.90 and the average family size was 3.33.

In the hamlet the population was spread out, with 28.5% under the age of 18, 7.0% from 18 to 24, 33.0% from 25 to 44, 24.2% from 45 to 64, and 7.3% 65 or older. The median age was 36 years. For every 100 females, there were 93.1 males. For every 100 females age 18 and over, there were 92.9 males.

The median household income was $73,333 and the median family income was $79,534. Males had a median income of $50,909 versus $38,080 for females. The per capita income for the hamlet was $25,821. About 1.9% of families and 2.3% of the population were below the poverty line, including 0.7% of those under age 18 and 3.3% of those age 65 or over.

References

Hamlets in New York (state)
Census-designated places in New York (state)
Census-designated places in Westchester County, New York
Hamlets in Westchester County, New York